Philadelphia Silver and Copper Mining Company was a 19th-century mining corporation chartered in Pennsylvania, April 8, 1864.  

It owned mining properties along the Colorado River in the Lower Colorado River Valley, in California and Arizona Territory in the 1860s.  The company involved eastern financiers including Thomas Tilden, Adolph Hugel, John Potter, William Reich, Alphonso F. Tilden, and Robert Smith.  

Its managing director was Alphonso F. Tilden, based in San Francisco.  

The company mining properties were silver mines in El Dorado Canyon in the Colorado Mining District of what was then Arizona Territory and after 1869 Lincoln County, Nevada; and copper mine in the Freeman Mining District in San Bernardino County, California across the river from Aubrey Landing.

See also
Colorado Mining District (New Mexico Territory)

References

Defunct mining companies of the United States
Mining in California
Silver mining in Nevada
Companies based in San Francisco
Defunct companies based in California
American companies established in 1864
Non-renewable resource companies established in 1864
1864 establishments in Pennsylvania